Mill Creek Summit, elevation , is a mountain pass in northern Los Angeles County, California. 

It is located at the highest point along the Angeles Forest Highway, which winds up into the San Gabriel Mountains from Soledad Pass up to the Angeles Crest Highway.

See also

Soledad Canyon
Escondido Summit
Islip Saddle

References 

Mountain passes of California
San Gabriel Mountains
Transportation in Los Angeles County, California